The 2007 TransAVIAexport Airlines Il-76 crash refers to an Ilyushin Il-76 cargo aircraft operated by that Belarusian airline that crashed in the outskirts of Mogadishu, Somalia, on 23 March 2007, during the Battle of Mogadishu. The plane was carrying repair equipment and humanitarian aid. According to a spokesperson for the transport ministry of Belarus, the aircraft was shot down. However, the Somali government insisted that the crash was accidental. A crew of eleven on board the aircraft perished in the accident.

Previous shootdown attempt of another company's aircraft

On 9 March 2007, a Transaviaexport Ilyushin Il-76TD, registration EW-78826, that was about to complete an Entebbe–Mogadishu flight carrying Ugandan peacekeepers and equipment, made a successful emergency landing at Mogadishu International Airport after having been struck by a rocket propelled grenade and catching fire on approach to the airport of destination. A crew of nine Belarusian were aboard the aircraft, along with six UPDF soldiers; all of them resulted unharmed. Islamist militia claimed the attack, saying that African Union peacekeepers were their target, as they were seen as invading troops; Somali officials denied such attack, and said the incident was due to the aircraft experiencing a technical failure.

There had been a report with unverified claims circulating on the internet stating that the aircraft had actually been carrying a secret load of infantry fighting vehicles for Ugandan troops. This report also claimed that these vehicles saved all occupants on board.

Description of the accident
The aircraft involved was an Ilyushin Il-76, a large Russian-built cargo aircraft. Registered as EW-78849, the Il-76 had been on a chartered cargo flight carrying equipment to Ugandan AMISOM peacekeepers in the Somali capital of Mogadishu. All of the crew members were Belarusian. Four of the personnel on board the accident aircraft were engineers who had worked on repairing another aircraft of the same type that had been the subject of an attempted shootdown 14 days earlier. Much of the equipment on board EW-78849 was for repairing the aircraft damaged earlier; the rest of the cargo was humanitarian aid. The first aircraft was still crippled at the departure time of EW-78849, and TransAVIAexport were considering whether to cannibalise it for re-usable parts.

EW-78849 was due to fly back to Belarus carrying equipment used for the repairs of EW-78826. The flight plan included a refuelling stop at Djibouti. Bound for Minsk, the aircraft had taken off from Mogadishu International Airport at 14:00 local time. According to Somali Interior Minister Mohamed Mahamud Guled, as soon as it reached  altitude, the pilot reported a problem in engine number two, stating that he would turn back to the airport. He was in the process of attempting to return to the airport for an emergency landing when one wing exploded, separated from the aircraft and fell into the Indian Ocean, while the rest of the plane continued, on fire, along the beach at a low altitude before crashing.

The accident occurred in an area called Kuluweyne, with the main part of the wreckage landing near a farmer's hamlet. A Reuters reporter who visited the scene reported seeing crushed animals, four corpses still on the ground, and wreckage spread across an area the size of four football fields. Rescuers found ten of the crew members dead at the scene, and an eleventh alive and wandering around the crash site. He was transported to a hospital where he died the same day. Operations at the airport were not affected by the crash, with Somali Prime Minister Ali Gedi and his delegation departing as scheduled from the airport the next day, destined for the Arab League summit in Saudi Arabia.

Alleged shootdown
A civilian who witnessed the crash said he heard what he believed to be a surface-to-air missile being fired immediately before the accident. "I saw with my eyes when the plane, which was flying low-level, was hit by a rocket and then fell to the ground," Shabelle reporter Maryan Hashi said." There have been reports that the projectile came from a small boat, and others that it came from a nearby farmers' market.

Crew
All eleven occupants on board the aircraft died in the incident. Their bodies were transported back to Belarus in a Gomelavia aircraft on 30 March 2007. On 2 April funeral services were held in Belarus for the victims, with hundreds attending. Eight of the victims were buried in a single lot at Maskouskiya cemetery, the rest in Vitsebsk.

Reactions and aftermath
The Somali authorities originally stated that the cause of the crash was unknown, and have since maintained that the crash occurred as a result of an accident, and that it had not been shot down. However, while not claiming responsibility for this specific attack, an Islamist web site published claims that the plane was indeed struck by a missile. Within 24 hours of the crash, Belarusian officials confirmed that the plane had been shot down. Somali soldiers began to guard the area against interference. TransAVIAexport suspended all flights to Somalia as a result of the incident, and Belarus advised its airlines not to enter Somali airspace. An investigation was launched by the Belarusian transport prosecutor's office for violations of Article 126 of the Criminal Code, which concerns international terrorism.

On 5 April 2007, the US Federal Aviation Administration released a communication prohibiting US airlines and commercial operators from operating over Somali airspace at altitudes below , due to possible threats from rocket propelled grenades and shoulder-launched missiles.

According to the Small Arms Survey 2008 Yearbook, the aircraft was shot down by one of two 9K38 Iglas fired by Hizbul Islam.

See also
List of airliner shootdown incidents

References

External links
Shabelle.net image gallery of crash site (Archive)
Pre-accident images of the aircraft

Accidents and incidents involving the Ilyushin Il-76
Aviation accidents and incidents in 2007
Aviation accidents and incidents in Somalia
Airliner shootdown incidents
2007 in Somalia
Mass murder in 2007
21st century in Mogadishu
21st-century aircraft shootdown incidents
March 2007 events in Africa
Somalia War (2006–2009)
2007 disasters in Somalia